Fort St. Mary's may refer to:
one of several early colonial fortifications at St. Mary's City, Maryland
a colonial fort at St. Mary's, Ohio
a colonial fort at Peace River, Alberta